William Wiseman Clarke of Ardington (1759–1826) was High Sheriff of Berkshire.

Biography
William was born in 1759 and was educated at John Roysse's Free School in Abingdon, (now Abingdon School). He received his later education at Christ Church, Oxford.

He lived at Ardington House and, in 1811, he was appointed High Sheriff of Berkshire.

He died on 4 September 1826 aged 67 and was described as one of the oldest magistrates and deputy-lieutenants of the county.

See also
 List of Old Abingdonians

References

1759 births
1826 deaths
High Sheriffs of Berkshire
People educated at Abingdon School
Alumni of Christ Church, Oxford
People from Vale of White Horse (district)